1988 Emmy Awards may refer to:

 40th Primetime Emmy Awards, the 1988 Emmy Awards ceremony honoring primetime programming
 15th Daytime Emmy Awards, the 1988 Emmy Awards ceremony honoring daytime programming
 16th International Emmy Awards, the 1988 Emmy Awards ceremony honoring international programming

Emmy Award ceremonies by year